Pontanus is a genus of lace bugs in the family Tingidae. There are at least four described species in Pontanus.

Species
 Pontanus accedens (Drake, 1947)
 Pontanus cafer (Distant, 1902)
 Pontanus gibbiferus (Walker, 1873)
 Pontanus puerilis (Drake & Poor, 1936)

References

Further reading

 
 
 
 
 

Tingidae
Cimicomorpha genera